Otis Hubbard Cooley (June 23, 1820 – November 18, 1860) was an American daguerreotype photographer who ran a studio in Springfield, Massachusetts, in the 19th century. The studio produced portraits of poet Emily Dickinson and her sister Lavinia Norcross Dickinson, among others.

He was a native of Granville, Massachusetts.

References

Images

Photographers from Massachusetts
1820 births
1860 deaths
Artists from Springfield, Massachusetts
19th-century American photographers
American Freemasons
People from Granville, Massachusetts